First Shot is a 1993 Hong Kong crime film produced and directed by David Lam and starring Ti Lung, Maggie Cheung, Simon Yam, Waise Lee, Canti Lau and Andy Hui. The film tells the story of events that led to the formation of the ICAC in Hong Kong in 1974.

Plot
During the early 1970s, the ICAC has not been established in Hong Kong yet and the city was swamped with corruption and widespread poverty. Police sergeant Wong Yat-chung (Ti Lung) is very upright and justice and refuses to partake with his corrupt colleagues and thus, he is marginalized from everyone else at the police station. During an operation, Wong's subordinate Sam Mok (Simon Yam) shoots Wong in the back heavily injuring him. Meanwhile, Governor Murray MacLehose delegates Sir Barry Drainage to investigate the corruption happening in Hong Kong. Drainage's assistant Annie Ma (Maggie Cheung) also enlists Wong for help. After investigating, Wong discovers that Mok was forced to shoot him earlier. Wong then recruits Mok alongside two elite cadets from the police academy to assist him in gathering evidence of corruption groups and begins Hong Kong's first strike against corruption.

Cast
Ti Lung as Wong Yat-chung
Maggie Cheung as Annie Ma
Simon Yam as Sam Mok
Waise Lee as Faucet Lui
Canti Lau as Yip Chun-wan
Andy Hui as Lo Kam-shui
Kam Hing-yin as Yip Fok, Anti-Corruption Division
Betsy Cheung as Chung's ex-wife
Bobby Yip as Chiu's hitman
Kong Man-sing as Brother Ho
Frankie Chan as Muscle
Hoi Sang Lee as Chiu's man
Chow Hong-chiu as Mak Kay
Jamie Luk as Martial Arts Instructor
Mantic Yiu as Helen
Wong Wai-chi
Leung Kam-san as Chan Ping
Wong Wa-ho as Mini bus driver
Jameson Lam as ICAC Agent
Wong Chi-keung as Chiu's Bodyguard
Tang Tai-wo as Chiu's Bodyguard
Ho Wing-cheung as policeman
Hui Si-man as Councillor
Leung Kai-chi as At Restaurant Opening
Wai Ching as Lui Lok
Leung Chung
Ling Chi-hung
Wong Man-chun as Policeman
Mak Shu-san
Yu Ming-hin
James M. Crockett
Yuen Kam-gai

Reception
Beyond Hollywood gave the film a negative review criticizing its lack of originality by directly lifting its plot, scenes and characters from Brian De Palma's The Untouchables and also criticizes its shoddy writing. Hong Kong Film Net rated the film 7 out of 10 stars and gave a positive review writing "The characters were enaging (especially Simon Yam's turn as a weaselly rat, a total 180 from the usual suave characters he plays), the story was interesting, and the action was pretty exciting. First Shot is really not that much different from many other similar movies (except that it is based -- albeit loosely -- on a true story), but it is done well and worth a look."

Box office
The film grossed HK$5,463,556 at the Hong Kong box office during its theatrical run from 25 February to 10 March 1993 in Hong Kong.

References

External links

First Shot at Hong Kong Cinemagic

1993 films
1993 crime thriller films
1993 action thriller films
1993 martial arts films
Hong Kong crime thriller films
Hong Kong action thriller films
Hong Kong martial arts films
Police detective films
Crime films based on actual events
Gun fu films
1990s Cantonese-language films
Films set in Hong Kong
Films shot in Hong Kong
Films set in the 1970s
Films directed by David Lam
1990s Hong Kong films